Harees, jareesh, boko boko, or harisa is a dish of boiled, cracked, or coarsely-ground wheat, mixed with meat and seasoned. Its consistency varies between a porridge and a gruel. Harees is a popular dish known throughout the Arab world, and is commonly eaten in Arab states of the Persian Gulf in the month of Ramadan

Etymology
Harees is derived from the verb which means to mash or to squash.

According to Armenian lore, the patron saint of Armenia, Gregory the Illuminator, was offering a meal of love and charity to the poor. There weren't enough sheep to feed the crowds so wheat was added to the cooking pots. They noticed that the wheat was sticking to the bottom of the cauldrons. Saint Gregory advised, "Harekh! Stir it!" Thus, the name of the dish, harissa, came from the saint's own words. Harissa has been offered as a charity meal ever since. The dish is traditionally served on Easter day. It is still prepared by many Armenians around the world and is also considered the national dish of Armenia.

History
Harees is documented in Ibn Sayyar al-Warraq's 10th-century cookbook Kitab Al Tabikh., as well as in al-Baghdadi's 13th-century cookbook Kitab Al Tabikh and ibn Razin al-Tujibi's  13th-century Andalusian cookbook Kitab Fadalat al-khiwan fi tayyibat al-ta'am w'al-alwan.

Harees is also the origin of haleem.

Preparation
The wheat is soaked overnight, then simmered in water along with meat and butter or sheep tail fat. Any remaining liquid is strained and the mixture is beaten and seasoned. Harees may be garnished with cinnamon, sugar, and clarified butter.

Variants and traditions
There is a different traditional way of preparing Harees in each of the Arab countries in the Arabian Peninsula area, and among the tribes of these countries. But there is a difference very simple that is optional in some countries. For example, in Saudi Arabia, cardamom pods (Hill or Cardamom) are added. Also it is decorated with parsley.

Harees was only made by the wealthy during Ramadan and Eid, for the duration of a three- to seven-day wedding. It was, however, customary for the Harees dishes to be shared with poorer neighbours on such occasions.

It is similar to kashkeg, a kind of homogeneous porridge made of previously stewed and boned chicken or lamb and coarsely ground soaked wheat (typically shelled wheat).

Arab cuisine

Harees is a popular dish in Arab cuisine, from the Levant to the Persian Gulf. It is often served during Ramadan, festivals such as Eid ul-Fitr, and at weddings. In Lebanon, it is often cooked on religious occasions in a communal pot, such as in Ashura. Harise is also a common dish in Syrian cuisine and Iraqi cuisine.

Formerly found only in homes, it is now served in restaurants as well.

Armenian cuisine

Harisa is traditionally served on Easter day, and is considered a national dish of Armenia. It is a thick porridge made from korkot (dried or roasted cracked wheat) and fat-rich meat, usually chicken or lamb. Herbs were substituted for meat in harissa when Armenian religious days required fasting and penance. The extremely long cooking process is an essential part of the harisa tradition. Like other ritual dishes, the time taken for preparation is part of its cherished value.

Harisa is known for helping the Armenians of Musa Ler (in modern-day Turkey) to survive during the resistance of 1915.

Kashmiri cuisine

Harisa or Hareesa (Kashmiri) in Kashmir is prepared during winter (Chillai Kalan ), typically made of mutton and rice flour and eaten with Kashmiri Bread called Girda (Kashmiri). It is cooked in huge degs (earthen pots) placed in wood fired ovens. Downtown Srinagar is considered as the hub of harisa making in Kashmir.

Zanzibari 
In Zanzibar, the dish is called boko boko and may be cooked with lamb, beef, or chicken.

Ethiopia 
Hareesa or Harees is a popular dish mainly in the Oromo region. It is cooked with lamb or beef and topped with dhadhaa/kibbeh and served on Eid or special occasions such as the birth of a baby.

See also

 List of porridges
 Keşkek

References

Arabic words and phrases
Arab desserts
Armenian cuisine
Bahraini cuisine
Emirati cuisine
Jordanian cuisine
Kuwaiti cuisine
Pakistani cuisine
Kashmiri cuisine
Porridges
Easter food
Levantine cuisine
Lebanese cuisine
Omani cuisine
Palestinian cuisine
Punjabi cuisine
Syrian cuisine
Iraqi cuisine